The 2021 West Florida Argonauts football team represented the University of West Florida as a member of the Gulf South Conference (GSC) during the 2021 NCAA Division II football season. They were led by sixth-year head coach Pete Shinnick. The Argonauts played their home games at Admiral Fetterman Field in Pensacola, Florida.

Previous season
The Argonauts finished the 2019 season 13–2, 7–1 in Gulf South Conference (GSC) play, to finish second in the conference standings. The 2019 team, won the 2019 NCAA Division II Football Championship by defeating , 48–40 in the 2019 NCAA Division II Football Championship Game. 

On August 12, 2020, Gulf South Conference postponed fall competition in 2020 for several sports due to the COVID-19 pandemic. A few months later in November, the conference announced that there would be no spring conference competition in football. Teams that opted-in to compete would have to schedule on their own. The Argonauts did not compete in the 2020 season and opted out of spring competition.

Schedule
West Florida announced their 2021 football schedule on March 24, 2021.

Rankings

Notes
1. West Florida's game against Fort Lauderdale on September 25, 2021, was canceled due to the Fort Lauderdale Eagles unable to field a team.

References

West Florida
West Florida Argonauts football seasons
Gulf South Conference football champion seasons
West Florida Argonauts football